Campbell Creek is a  long 1st order tributary to Pine Creek in Warren County, Pennsylvania.

Course
Campbell Creek rises on the Caldwell Creek divide about 2.5 miles west of Whitehead Corners, Pennsylvania.  Campbell Creek then flows south to Pine Creek about 2.5 miles southwest of McGraw Corners, Pennsylvania.

Watershed
Campbell Creek drains  of area, receives about 44.8 in/year of precipitation, has a topographic wetness index of 434.12 and is about 92% forested.

References

Rivers of Pennsylvania
Rivers of Warren County, Pennsylvania